The men's 10 metre platform competition of the diving events at the 2011 World Aquatics Championships was held on July 23 with the preliminary round and the semifinals and the final on 24 July.

Medalists

Results
The preliminary round was held on July 23 at 10:00. The semifinal was held on July 23 at 14:00. The final was held on July 24 at 16:05.

Green denotes finalists

Blue denotes semifinalists

References

External links
2011 World Aquatics Championships: Men's 10 m platform start list, from OmegaTiming.com; retrieved 2011-07-17.

Men's 10 m platform